Javier 'Manix' Mandiola Alberdi (born 9 April 1958) is a Spanish retired professional footballer who played as a forward, and is a current coach.

His managerial career of over two decades was spent almost entirely in Segunda División B, though he also managed in Segunda División with Eibar and Alavés.

Playing career
Born in Eibar, Gipuzkoa, Mandiola finished his graduation with SD Eibar, but only appeared notably with Sestao River Club in the 1985–86 season, playing for the Basque side in Segunda División.

Manager career
After hanging up his boots Mandiola was a manager of SD Eibar B. In 2003, he joined SD Beasain in Tercera División. After a season, Mandiola was appointed Real Unión manager, and despite finishing second in his first season, he was dismissed in his second due to poor results.

In 2006, Mandiola was appointed Eibar manager, and achieved promotion from the third level at first attempt. He managed to lead the club to a mid-table finish in their return to the second division, but was relieved to his duties nonetheless.

On 23 December 2008 Mandiola was appointed Deportivo Alavés manager. He was sacked only less than two months later.

On 27 April 2010 Mandiola returned to Eibar, with the club back to the third division; he was relieved from his duties in the end of the 2011–12 season, after missing the promotion in both play-offs.

On 28 December 2013 Mandiola was appointed CD Tudelano manager. He announced his departure from the club on 6 May 2016, and was appointed at the helm of Burgos CF on 27 September. He was sacked on 25 April 2017.

Mandiola was appointed by CD Atlético Baleares in February 2018, on a deal until the end of the season. In his first full season in Palma de Mallorca, the team won their Segunda B group and lost the play-off final to CD Mirandés on the away goals rule after a 3–3 aggregate draw.

On 28 August 2020, Mandiola replaced Luis Carrión at the helm of CD Numancia, recently relegated to division three. He was himself dismissed the following 17 January, after four wins in 11 matches overall.

Managerial statistics

References

External links

1958 births
Living people
Spanish footballers
Footballers from Eibar
Association football forwards
Segunda División players
Segunda División B players
SD Eibar footballers
Real Sociedad B footballers
Burgos CF (1936) footballers
Real Unión footballers
Sestao River footballers
Segunda División managers
Segunda División B managers
Spanish football managers
Real Unión managers
SD Eibar managers
Deportivo Alavés managers
Burgos CF managers
CD Numancia managers